Boris Sokolov may refer to:

 Boris Sergeyevich Sokolov (1914–2013), Russian geologist, paleontologist and academician
 Boris Vadimovich Sokolov (born 1957), historian and Russian literature researcher
 Boris Sokolov (1944–2022), Russian actor in The Hobbit (1985 film)
 Boris Sokoloff (1893–1979), Russian doctor, politician, cancer researcher and author.